The Song of Songs is a 1918 American silent drama film produced by Famous Players-Lasky and based on a 1914 stage play version by Edward Sheldon of the 1908 novel by Hermann Sudermann, The Song of Songs. This picture was directed by Joseph Kaufman and stars Elsie Ferguson. This was Kaufman's last film before his death on February 1, 1918,  very early on during the 1918 flu pandemic.

This film is now considered a lost film.

The story was remade as Lily of the Dust (1924) with Pola Negri and Ben Lyon. Marlene Dietrich starred in the first sound version The Song of Songs (1933).

Plot summary
Lily, an innocent young girl, is convinced to pose nude for a young sculptor. They fall in love, but the sculptor fears the effect of marriage on his work and neglects Lily. Ultimately, in despair, she marries a wealthy older man but does not find happiness there. Only near-tragedy and scandal are able, ironically, to bring her that happiness.

Cast
Elsie Ferguson as Lily Kardos
Frank Losee as Senator Calkins
Crauford Kent as Dick Laird
Cecil Fletcher as Stephen Bennett
Gertrude Berkeley as Mrs. Kardos
Corene Uzzell as Ann Merkle (credited as Corinne Usell)
Charles Wellesley as Mrs. Atwell
Henry Leone as Anslem Kardos
Robert Cummings as Phineas Bennett
Ned Burton (unknown role)

Reception
Like many American films of the time, The Song of Songs was subject to cuts and restrictions by city and state film censorship boards. For example, the Chicago Board of Censors issued the film an Adults Only permit.

References

External links

Film still
kinotv

1918 films
American silent feature films
American films based on plays
Films based on German novels
Films based on works by Edward Sheldon
Films based on works by Hermann Sudermann
Lost American films
Famous Players-Lasky films
Films based on adaptations
Films directed by Joseph Kaufman
American black-and-white films
Films based on multiple works
Silent American drama films
1918 drama films
1918 lost films
Lost drama films
1910s American films
1910s English-language films